The 1925 Western State Normal Hilltoppers football team represented Western State Normal School (later renamed Western Michigan University) as an independent during the 1925 college football season.  In their second season under head coach Earl Martineau, the Hilltoppers compiled a 6–2–1 record and outscored their opponents, 125 to 47. Quarterback Walter Farrer was the team captain.

Schedule

References

Western State Normal
Western Michigan Broncos football seasons
Western State Normal Hilltoppers football